8 Bit Head: Complete Remix of Easy Listening + Other Stuff is a 2004 album by Pigface and Defrag.

Track listing

Pigface albums
Collaborative albums
2004 remix albums